Qatar competed at the 2012 Summer Paralympics in London, United Kingdom, from August 29 to September 9.

The country was represented by a single athlete, Abdulrahman Abdulqader Abdulrahman, in field events: the discus, the javelin and the shot put.

Athletics 

Men’s Field Events

See also
Summer Paralympic disability classification
Qatar at the Paralympics
Qatar at the 2012 Summer Olympics

Notes

Nations at the 2012 Summer Paralympics
2012
Paralympics